Factor XI or plasma thromboplastin antecedent is the zymogen form of factor XIa, one of the enzymes of the coagulation cascade. Like many other coagulation factors, it is a serine protease.  In humans, Factor XI is encoded by the F11 gene.

Function 

Factor XI (FXI) is produced by the liver and circulates as a homo-dimer in its inactive form. The plasma half-life of FXI is approximately 52 hours. The zymogen factor is activated into factor XIa by factor XIIa (FXIIa), thrombin, and FXIa itself; due to its activation by FXIIa, FXI is a member of the "contact pathway" (which includes HMWK, prekallikrein, factor XII, factor XI, and factor IX).

Factor XIa activates factor IX by selectively cleaving arg-ala and arg-val peptide bonds. Factor IXa, in turn, forms a complex with Factor VIIIa (FIXa-FVIIIa) and activates factor X.

Physiological inhibitors of factor XIa include protein Z-dependent protease inhibitor (ZPI, a member of the serine protease inhibitor/serpin class of proteins), which is independent of protein Z (its action on factor X, however, is protein Z-dependent, hence its name).

Structure 

Although synthesized as a single polypeptide chain, FXI circulates as a homodimer. Every chain has a relative molecular mass of approximately 80000. Typical plasma concentrations of FXI are 5 μg/mL, corresponding to a plasma concentration (of FXI dimers) of approximately 30 nM.
The FXI gene is 23kb in length, has 15 exons, and is found on chromosome 4q32-35.

Factor XI consists of four apple domains, that create a disk-like platform around the base of a fifth, catalytic serine protease domain.
One contains a binding site for thrombin, another for high molecular weight kininogen, a third one for factor IX, heparin and glycoprotein Ib and the fourth is implicated in forming the factor XI homodimer, including a cysteine residue that creates a disulfide bond.

In the homodimer, the apple domains create two disk-like platforms connected together at an angle, with the catalytic domains sticking out at each side of the dimer.

Activation by thrombin or factor XIIa is achieved by cleavage of Arg369-Ile370 peptide bonds on both subunits of the dimer. This results in a partial detachment of the catalytic domain from the disk-like apple domains, still linked to the fourth domain with a disulfide bond, but now farther from the third domain.
This is thought that this exposes the factor IX binding site of the third apple domain, allowing factor XI's protease activity on it.

Role in disease 

Deficiency of factor XI causes the rare hemophilia C; this mainly occurs in Ashkenazi Jews and is believed to affect approximately 8% of that population. Less commonly, hemophilia C can be found in Jews of Iraqi ancestry and in Israeli Arabs. The condition has been described in other populations at around 1% of cases. It is an autosomal recessive disorder. There is little spontaneous bleeding, but surgical procedures may cause excessive blood loss, and prophylaxis is required.

Low levels of factor XI also occur in many other disease states, including Noonan syndrome.

High levels of factor XI have been implicated in thrombosis, although it is uncertain what determines these levels and how serious the procoagulant state is.

Pharmacological inhibitors of factor XI that are under clinical development but not yet approved for treatment  include the oral factor XIa inhibitors Asundexian (BAY 2433334) and Milvexian as well as the monoclonal anti-factor XI antibody Abelacimab (MAA868).

See also 
Contact activation pathway (also known as the intrinsic pathway)
Tissue factor pathway (also known as the extrinsic pathway)

References

Further reading

External links 
 The MEROPS online database for peptidases and their inhibitors: S01.213

EC 3.4.21
Coagulation system
Zymogens